Baby (lit:Infant) is a Pakistani soap drama television series that aired from 27 February to 18 August 2017. It aired every Monday to Thursday 8:00pm PST. It revolves around Alia, lovingly called "Baby" (Anzela Abbasi), who falls in love with a man from rural areas who belongs to a lower social class than her.

Cast
 Anzela Abbasi as Aliya (Baby)
 Behroze Sabzwari as Aliya's father
 Sabahat Ali Bukhari as Shayan
 Asim Mehmood as Sarwae
 Raima Khan as Soni
 Arsalan Raja as Saleem
 Adnan Shah Tipu as Saarim
 Anushey Ali as Shaukat
 Sheeba Butt as Sughra

References

External links 
 

2010s romantic drama television series
2017 Pakistani television series debuts
2017 Pakistani television series endings
Pakistani drama television series
Serial drama television series